Tillandsia pohliana is a species in the genus Tillandsia. This species is native to Bolivia, Peru, Argentina, Paraguay, and Brazil.

References

pohliana
Flora of South America
Plants described in 1894